Faridkot Lok Sabha constituency is one of the 13 Lok Sabha (parliamentary) constituencies in Punjab state in northern India.

Assembly segments
Presently, Faridkot Lok Sabha constituency comprises the following nine Vidhan Sabha (legislative assembly) segments:

Members of Parliament

Election results

General elections 2019

General elections 2014

General elections 2009

See also
 Faridkot district
 List of Constituencies of the Lok Sabha
 Moga district

Notes

External links
Faridkot lok sabha  constituency election 2019 result details

Lok Sabha constituencies in Punjab, India
Faridkot district
Moga district